William Wotherspoon may refer to:

William Wotherspoon (rugby union) (1868-1942), Scottish rugby union international
William Wallace Wotherspoon (1850-1921), Chief of Staff of the U.S. Army
William Wallace Wotherspoon (painter) (1821-1888), American landscape painter